Phibsborough is a stop on the Luas light-rail tram system in Dublin, Ireland.  It opened in 2017 as a stop on Luas Cross City, an extension of the Green Line through the city centre from St. Stephen's Green to Broombridge.

The stop provides access to the neighbourhood of Phibsborough and the Dalymount Park football stadium.

Layout
Phibsborough stop is located in the cutting which once took heavy rail trains to Dublin Broadstone railway station but lay disused for many years.  The stop is in-between Cabra Road and North Circular Road, both of which cross the line on bridges. The cutting is very narrow at this point, and the stop is bound by steep walls on each side covered with stone bricks.  The edge platforms are considerably narrower than on most Luas stops, and have shelters, benches, information displays and Leap card validators.

The stop has entrances at both ends, taking passengers from the road bridges onto wooden walkways over the tracks.  At each end there is a wooden staircase directly opposite the entrance and a glass lift shaft on the opposite side.  The ticket machines are also located at this level.  Owing to the limited space, Phibsborough is the only Luas stop which does not have ticket machines at platform level.

References

Luas Green Line stops in Dublin (city)
Railway stations opened in 2017
2017 establishments in Ireland
Railway stations in the Republic of Ireland opened in the 21st century